Homer Township is the name of some places in the U.S. state of Michigan:

 Homer Township, Calhoun County, Michigan
 Homer Township, Midland County, Michigan

See also 
 Home Township, Michigan (disambiguation)
 Homestead Township, Michigan
 Homer Township (disambiguation)

Michigan township disambiguation pages